"L'immensità" (in English: Immensity) is an Italian song, which was first performed by Johnny Dorelli and Don Backy (the songs were sung by two artists) in 1967 and became 9th at the Sanremo Song Contest. This is one Johnny Dorelli's signature songs, entering for several weeks in the Italian charts.

L'immensità/Soltanto Il Sottoscritto
Johnny Dorelli inserted Song in 1967 45s L'immensità/Soltanto Il Sottoscritto and in 1967 33s L'Immensità."Soltanto Il Sottoscritto" is a  Rhythm And Blues song, written by the same Johnny Dorelli.

Covers
The song was later covered by a number of artists.

 Clara Nunes – Brazil version in Portugal as A Imensidão included in the 1967 7", EP Clara Nunes.
 Mina - Italian version performed at the Sabato Sera series of grand variety shows and released on the LP Sabato sera - Studio Uno '67; Spanish version "La inmensidad" released in Spain and Latin American countries. 
 Milva Video
 Sofia Rotaru twice: in Italian and in Ukrainian as "Grey Bird". The Ukrainian version became part of the 1971 movie Chervona Ruta and was released in the 2003 LP album Yedinomu in the remastered version.
 Lili Ivanova – version in Bulgarian as В безкрайността included in the 1969 LP album Camino.
 Francesco Renga
 Elena Roger
 Mónica Naranjo - version in Spanish titled "Inmensidad", included in the 2000 album Minage.
 The Flemish singer Licia Fox, sang a cover of this piece, in Italian language (2014)
Italian trio Il Volo at Sanremo Music Festival 2015

References

Italian songs
Sofia Rotaru songs
Sanremo Music Festival songs
Compagnia Generale del Disco singles